Pete Sampras defeated Boris Becker in the final, 4–6, 6–3, 7–5, 6–4 to win the singles tennis title at the 1994 ATP Tour World Championships. It was his second Tour Finals title.

Michael Stich was the reigning champion, but failed to qualify that year.

Seeds

Draw

Finals

White group
Standings are determined by: 1. number of wins; 2. number of matches; 3. in two-players-ties, head-to-head records; 4. in three-players-ties, percentage of sets won, or of games won; 5. steering-committee decision.

Red group
Standings are determined by: 1. number of wins; 2. number of matches; 3. in two-players-ties, head-to-head records; 4. in three-players-ties, percentage of sets won, or of games won; 5. steering-committee decision.

See also
 ATP World Tour Finals appearances

References
 ATP Tour World Championship Singles Draw

Singles
Tennis tournaments in Germany
1994 in German tennis
Sports competitions in Frankfurt